Intermountain Airlines, also known as Intermountain Aviation and Intermountain Airways, was a Central Intelligence Agency (CIA) airline front company. Intermountain performed covert operations for the CIA in Southeast Asia and elsewhere during the Vietnam War era.

History

Intermountain's main base of operations was Marana Army Air Field near Tucson, Arizona. In 1975, it was acquired by Evergreen International Aviation, a company that has acknowledged connections with the CIA. Other CIA "proprietary" airlines such as Air America and Air Asia also operated out of Marana during the Vietnam War years.

During its years in operation, Intermountain used several types of aircraft including the Curtiss C-46 Commando, the Lockheed L-188 Electra, the de Havilland Canada DHC-4 Caribou and DHC-6 Twin Otter.

One of Intermountain's covert missions was Project Coldfeet, in which intelligence operatives were dropped in the Arctic to reconnoiter an abandoned Soviet drift station and then recovered using a Fulton Skyhook recovery system mounted on an Intermountain B-17 Flying Fortress. The modified B-17G, civilian registration N809Z (now N207EV), had previously operated out of Clark Air Base in the Philippines in an all-black scheme for the CIA for agent insertions and other unspecified covert operations in Southeast Asia. The B-17 and its skyhook appeared at the end of the James Bond film Thunderball.

Intermountain is alleged to have been involved in the delivery of a number of A-26 Invader bombers to be flown by Cuban exile pilots supporting the Bay of Pigs Invasion.

See also
Pacific Corporation
Pinal Airpark
St. Lucia Airways
 List of defunct airlines of the United States

Sources
 James Bamford, "Body of Secrets : Anatomy of the Ultra-Secret National Security Agency", Anchor Books(2002), 
 Brendan January, "The CIA", Franklin Watts ( 2003), 
 Scott A. Thompson, "Final Cut - The Post-War B-17 Flying Fortress: The Survivors", Pictorial Histories Publishing Company, Missoula, Montana, Revised Edition, August 2000, 
 The history of Intermountain Aviation, Inc., as a CIA air proprietary, is examined in Jason H. Gart, "Electronics and Aerospace Industry in Cold War Arizona, 1945-1968: Motorola, Hughes Aircraft, Goodyear Aircraft." Ph.D. diss., Arizona State University, 2006.

References

External links

Information on Marana Army Airfield 
 Studies in Intelligence: Operation Coldfeet

Central Intelligence Agency front organizations
Defunct airlines of the United States
Defunct companies based in Arizona
Airlines disestablished in 1975